Mittelhauser is a surname. Notable people with the surname include:

 Eugène Mittelhauser (1873–1949), French general
 Jon Mittelhauser (born 1970), American computer programmer